The men's 50 metre freestyle event at the 2000 Summer Olympics took place on 21–22 September at the Sydney International Aquatic Centre in Sydney, Australia.

U.S. swimmers Gary Hall, Jr. and Anthony Ervin, who trained together at the Phoenix Swim Club, tied for the gold; they finished with a matching time of 21.98, edging out Dutch swimmer Pieter van den Hoogenband in 22.03.

Italy's Lorenzo Vismara finished fourth in 22.11, while Poland's Bartosz Kizierowski was a fraction behind the leading pack in sixth at 22.22. Russia's double defending champion Alexander Popov finished outside the medals in sixth place with a time of 22.24. Great Britain's four-time Olympian Mark Foster (22.41) and Ukraine's Oleksandr Volynets (22.51) rounded out the finale. Earlier in the prelims, Volynets made a surprise packet with a ninth fastest time and a Ukrainian record of 22.52 to lead the sixth heat.

Ervin stopped swimming competitively in 2003, auctioned off his gold medal on eBay to aid survivors of the 2004 tsunami, but returned from retirement to claim his place on his second Olympics, in London, twelve years after his first.  Both men would later continue to win another gold in this event outright (Hall, Jr. in 2004 and Ervin in 2016), edging out the runner-up by 0.01 second in their respective races.

Records
Prior to this competition, the existing world and Olympic records were as follows.

Competition format

In a change from previous Games, the competition consisted of three rounds: heats, semifinals, and a final. The swimmers with the best 16 times in the heats advanced to the semifinals. The swimmers with the best 8 times in the semifinals advanced to the final. Swim-offs were used as necessary to break ties for advancement to the next round.

Results

Heats

Semifinals

Final

References

External links
Official Olympic Report

F
Men's events at the 2000 Summer Olympics